Indiana Orthopaedic Hospital, also known as OrthoIndy Hospital, is a 37-bed acute care hospital that specializes in musculoskeletal therapy located in Indianapolis, Indiana. The hospital is Indiana's first specialty hospital with a focus on orthopedics. The hospital was founded in 2005 by OrthoIndy physicians to provide focused care on orthopedic procedures, physical therapy, and imaging services. It includes both inpatient and outpatient procedures, but does not provide emergency services. OrthoIndy Hospital is accredited by the American Osteopathic Association's Healthcare Facilities Accreditation Program.

See also
List of hospitals in Indianapolis

References 

Hospital buildings completed in 2005
Healthcare in Indianapolis
Hospitals in Indiana